The Lyon trolleybus system is part of the public transport network of the city and commune of Lyon, France.  Opened in 1935, it combines with the Lyon Metro, the Lyon tramway network and Lyon's urban motorbus network to form an integrated system.

Lyon was one of the first cities in France to experience trolleybuses. In 1961, the Lyon trolleybus system had the largest number of trolleybuses ever to operate simultaneously in France (370 vehicles). In the 21st century, it has been a leader in the development of new trolley buses.

The system is owned by SYTRAL, and, like most of the rest of the four managed transportation systems, is operated by Keolis Lyon on behalf of Transports en commun lyonnais (TCL).  Since 2006, it has been expanded by the electrification of two major new lines (C1 and C2).  , the system consisted of nine lines.

Lines 
The Lyon trolleybus system is presently made up of the following lines:

 

All of these lines, except line S6, offer a high level of service, and operate 7 days a week from 5 am to midnight, with frequent services on weekdays from 7.00 am to 8.00 pm (usually every 8 to 10 minutes, at most every 12 minutes).  They provide an attractive and permanent service throughout the year, including during school holiday periods.

Lines C1 to C3 are equipped with a signal priority system, dedicated lanes for almost their entire routes, and high-capacity bus shelters fitted with ticket distributors.

The principle was extended on 29 August 2011 to 23 other lines, some operated by trolleybuses, and the rest by motorbuses. The letter "C" has been retained a designator of these lines, but no longer has any other meaning.

Fleet

, the Lyon trolleybus fleet stood at 131 vehicles, of which 76 were rigid buses and 55 articulated buses:

See also

List of trolleybus systems in France

References

External links

 
 

Transport in Lyon
Lyon
Lyon
1935 establishments in France